The Pointe de Vouasson is a mountain of the Swiss Pennine Alps, overlooking Lac des Dix in the canton of Valais. It lies between the valleys of Hérémence (west) and Arolla (east), north of the Aiguilles Rouges d'Arolla.

The east side of the mountain is covered by a glacier named Glacier de Vouasson.

References

External links
 Pointe de Vouasson on Hikr

Mountains of the Alps
Alpine three-thousanders
Mountains of Switzerland
Mountains of Valais